Susner Assembly constituency is one of the 230 Vidhan Sabha (Legislative Assembly) constituencies of Madhya Pradesh state in central India.

It is part of Agar Malwa District. It comes under Malwa region. Still largely influenced from the Culture of Rajasthan. It exists as one of the border between Madhya Pradesh and Rajasthan.

Members of the Legislative Assembly

See also
Susner

References

Assembly constituencies of Madhya Pradesh